Scolopendra dehaani, common name Giant Vietnamese centipede, is a large Scolopendrid centipede found across Mainland Southeast Asia. It is also found in India, Japan, Hong Kong, and the Andaman and Nicobar Islands.

Taxonomy 
Scolopendra dehaani was originally named by Brandt in 1840, but was reclassified by Carl Attems in 1930 as a subspecies of Scolopendra subspinipes. A 2012 paper reclassified it as a separate species.

Morphology 
Scolopendra dehaani is one of the largest centipedes in the genus Scolopendra, and some specimens have been found to reach or exceed 25 cm in length. It usually lives for five to six years. Specimens usually have brownish-orange tergites (the hard plates on the tops of the segments) and yellow . In a 2016 paper, the authors suggested S. dehaani has five distinct colour morphs: four were dichromatic, one other was monochromatic, and all were generally reddish, brown, or orange in coloration:

Diet 
Scolopendra dehaani usually preys on smaller arthropods such as insects, spiders, and vinegaroons, but they have been found eating small snakes and other vertebrates, including, in one observation, a tree frog.

One paper suggested that S. dehaani forages arboreally, and it has even been recorded doing so in daytime.

References 

dehaani